{{Infobox song
| name       = Sho Lee
| cover      = Sean Tizzle Sho Lee.jpg
| alt        =
| type       = single
| artist     = Sean Tizzle
| album      =
| released   = 
| recorded   = 2013
| studio     =
| venue      =
| genre      = Afro pop
| length     = 
| label      = Difference Entertainment
| writer     = Morihanfen Oluwaseun Oluwabamidele
| producer   = D'Tunes
| chronology = Sean Tizzle
| prev_title =
| prev_year  =
| next_title = ''Boogie Down| next_year  = 2013
}}

"Sho Lee'''" is a song by Nigerian recording artist Sean Tizzle. The song was produced by Nigeria producer D'Tunes and it was nominated for Producer of the Year at The Headies 2013 which eventually it won

Live performances
Sean Tizzle performed "Sho Lee" on stage at the Indigo2 during the Cokobar Music Festival.

Accolades
"Sho Lee" won the Producer of the Year at The Headies 2013 which.

Press releases
There has been some issues surrounding “Sho lee” singer Sean Tizzle and Sound Sultan, these issues arose as a result of Sean Tizzle‘s switch from Sound Sultan‘s music label Naija Ninjas to D’tunes‘ label Difference Entertainment.

Release history

Covers and remixes
Digital download
"Sho Lee" (Yemi Sax) - 3:56
"Sho Lee" (Giftty) - 4:02
"Fever" (Foster) - 4:03
"Show Me" (MK60) - 3:13
"Ishi Olee" (H2O) - 4:08
"Skodo" (LMG) - 3:45

References

External links
 

2013 singles
2013 songs
Sean Tizzle songs
Song recordings produced by D'Tunes
Nigerian afropop songs